RAF Henley-on-Thames is a former Royal Air Force grass-strip airfield in Berkshire, England, located near Henley-on-Thames. It was also known by a variety of other names: Cockpole Green, Upper Culham Farm, Crazies Hill, or Crazies Hill Farm.

History
The site was used to assemble and test Supermarine Spitfires (produced locally by dispersed manufacturers in the Reading area), and as a Relief Landing Ground for RAF White Waltham and RAF Woodley. It was built in late 1939 and closed in October 1945. In 1944 No.529 Squadron moved to RAF Henley-on-Thames from RAF Halton in Buckinghamshire. This squadron was initially equipped with autogyros but in the spring of 1945 they took delivery of the new American Sikorsky R-4 helicopter (known as the 'Hoverfly' in British service), RAF Henley-on-Thames becoming the first RAF air base to host an operational helicopter squadron.

Current use
As well as agricultural land, there is now a business park at the Upper Culham Farm site, off Culham Lane. There is currently little to indicate on satellite imagery that an airfield once existed here as the runways were grass. The only extant building from the aerodrome is a round defensive pillbox (F.C. Type, Mushroom Type or Oakington Type) in the middle of a field close to Ashley Hill Place, at coordinates 51.5293384 N 0.8524861 W.

See also
 List of former Royal Air Force stations

References

External links
Notes on Spitfire production

1939 establishments in the United Kingdom
1945 disestablishments in the United Kingdom
Henley-On-Thames
Henley-on-Thames